New Latin (also called Neo-Latin or Modern Latin) is the revival of Literary Latin used in original, scholarly, and scientific works since about 1500. Modern scholarly and technical nomenclature, such as in zoological and botanical taxonomy and international scientific vocabulary, draws extensively from New Latin vocabulary, often in the form of classical or neoclassical compounds. New Latin includes extensive new word formation. As a language for full expression in prose or poetry, however, it is often distinguished from its successor, Contemporary Latin.

Extent
Classicists use the term "Neo-Latin" to describe the Latin that developed in Renaissance Italy as a result of renewed interest in classical civilization in the 14th and 15th centuries.

Neo-Latin also describes the use of the Latin language for any purpose, scientific or literary, during and after the Renaissance. The beginning of the period cannot be precisely identified; however, the spread of secular education, the acceptance of humanistic literary norms, and the wide availability of Latin texts following the invention of printing, mark the transition to a new era of scholarship at the end of the 15th century. The end of the New Latin period is likewise indeterminate, but Latin as a regular vehicle of communicating ideas became rare following the dissolution of the Holy Roman Empire as well as the Congress of Vienna where French replaced Latin as the language of diplomacy. By 1900, Latin survived primarily in international scientific vocabulary and taxonomy. The term "New Latin" came into widespread use towards the end of the 1890s among linguists and scientists.

New Latin was, at least in its early days, an international language used throughout Catholic and Protestant Europe, as well as in the colonies of the major European powers. This area consisted of most of Europe, including Central Europe and Scandinavia; its southern border was the Mediterranean Sea, with the division more or less corresponding to the modern eastern borders of Finland, the Baltic states, Poland, Slovakia, Hungary and Croatia.

Russia's acquisition of Kyiv in the later 17th century introduced the study of Latin to Russia. Nevertheless, the use of Latin in Orthodox eastern Europe did not reach high levels due to their strong cultural links to the cultural heritage of Ancient Greece and Byzantium, as well as Greek and Old Church Slavonic languages.

Though Latin and New Latin are considered dead (having no native speakers), large parts of their vocabulary have seeped into English and several Germanic languages. In the case of English, about 60% of the lexicon can trace its origin to Latin, thus many English speakers can recognize New Latin terms with relative ease as cognates are quite common.

History

Beginnings
New Latin was inaugurated as Renaissance Latin by the triumph of the humanist reform of Latin education, led by such writers as Erasmus, More, and Colet. Medieval Latin had been the practical working language of the Roman Catholic Church, taught throughout Europe to aspiring clerics and refined in the medieval universities. It was a flexible language, full of neologisms and often composed without reference to the grammar or style of classical (usually pre-Christian) authors. The humanist reformers sought both to purify Latin grammar and style, and to make Latin applicable to concerns beyond the ecclesiastical, creating a body of Latin literature outside the bounds of the Church. Attempts at reforming Latin use occurred sporadically throughout the period, becoming most successful in the mid-to-late 19th century.

Height

The Protestant Reformation (1520–1580), though it removed Latin from the liturgies of the churches of Northern Europe, may have advanced the cause of the new secular Latin. The period during and after the Reformation, coinciding with the growth of printed literature, saw the growth of an immense body of New Latin literature, on all kinds of secular as well as religious subjects.

The heyday of New Latin was its first two centuries (1500–1700), when in the continuation of the Medieval Latin tradition, it served as the lingua franca of science, education, and to some degree diplomacy in Europe. Classic works such as Thomas More's Utopia and Newton's Principia Mathematica (1687) were written in the language. Throughout this period, Latin was a universal school subject, and indeed, the pre-eminent subject for elementary education in most of Europe and other places of the world that shared its culture. All universities required Latin proficiency (obtained in local grammar schools) to obtain admittance as a student. Latin was an official language of Poland—recognised and widely used between the 9th and 18th centuries, commonly used in foreign relations and popular as a second language among some of the nobility.

Through most of the 17th century, Latin was also supreme as an international language of diplomatic correspondence, used in negotiations between nations and the writing of treaties, e.g. the peace treaties of Osnabrück and Münster (1648). As an auxiliary language to the local vernaculars, New Latin appeared in a wide variety of documents, ecclesiastical, legal, diplomatic, academic, and scientific. While a text written in English, French, or Spanish at this time might be understood by a significant cross section of the learned, only a Latin text could be certain of finding someone to interpret it anywhere between Lisbon and Helsinki.

As late as the 1720s, Latin was still used conversationally, and was serviceable as an international auxiliary language between people of different countries who had no other language in common. For instance, the Hanoverian king George I of Great Britain (reigned 1714–1727), who had no command of spoken English, communicated in Latin with his Prime Minister Robert Walpole, who knew neither German nor French.

Decline
By about 1700, the growing movement for the use of national languages (already found earlier in literature and the Protestant religious movement) had reached academia, and an example of the transition is Newton's writing career, which began in New Latin and ended in English (e.g. Opticks, 1704). A much earlier example is Galileo c. 1600, some of whose scientific writings were in Latin, some in Italian, the latter to reach a wider audience. By contrast, while German philosopher Christian Wolff (1679–1754) popularized German as a language of scholarly instruction and research, and wrote some works in German, he continued to write primarily in Latin, so that his works could more easily reach an international audience (e.g., Philosophia moralis, 1750–53).

Likewise, in the early 18th century, French replaced Latin as a diplomatic language, due to the commanding presence in Europe of the France of Louis XIV. At the same time, some (like King Frederick William I of Prussia) were dismissing Latin as a useless accomplishment, unfit for a man of practical affairs. The last international treaty to be written in Latin was the Treaty of Vienna in 1738; after the War of the Austrian Succession (1740–48) international diplomacy was conducted predominantly in French.

A diminishing audience combined with diminishing production of Latin texts pushed Latin into a declining spiral from which it has not recovered. As it was gradually abandoned by various fields, and as less written material appeared in it, there was less of a practical reason for anyone to bother to learn Latin; as fewer people knew Latin, there was less reason for material to be written in the language. Latin came to be viewed as esoteric, irrelevant, and too difficult. As languages like French, Italian, German, and English became more widely known, use of a 'difficult' auxiliary language seemed unnecessary—while the argument that Latin could expand readership beyond a single nation was fatally weakened if, in fact, Latin readers did not compose a majority of the intended audience.

As the 18th century progressed, the extensive literature in Latin being produced at the beginning slowly contracted. By 1800 Latin publications were far outnumbered, and often outclassed, by writings in the modern languages. Latin literature lasted longest in very specific fields (e.g. botany and zoology) where it had acquired a technical character, and where a literature available only to a small number of learned individuals could remain viable. By the end of the 19th century, Latin in some instances functioned less as a language than as a code capable of concise and exact expression, as for instance in physicians' prescriptions, or in a botanist's description of a specimen. In other fields (e.g. anatomy or law) where Latin had been widely used, it survived in technical phrases and terminology. The perpetuation of Ecclesiastical Latin in the Roman Catholic Church through the 20th century can be considered a special case of the technicalizing of Latin, and the narrowing of its use to an elite class of readers.

By 1900, creative Latin composition, for purely artistic purposes, had become rare. Authors such as Arthur Rimbaud and Max Beerbohm wrote Latin verse, but these texts were either school exercises or occasional pieces. Some of the last survivals of New Latin to convey non-technical information appear in the use of Latin to cloak passages and expressions deemed too indecent (in the 19th century) to be read by children, the lower classes, or (most) women. Such passages appear in translations of foreign texts and in works on folklore, anthropology, and psychology, e.g. Krafft-Ebing's Psychopathia Sexualis (1886).

Crisis and transformation

Latin as a language held a place of educational pre-eminence until the second half of the 19th century in the English speaking world. At that point its value was increasingly questioned; in the 20th century, educational philosophies such as that of John Dewey dismissed its relevance. At the same time, the philological study of Latin appeared to show that the traditional methods and materials for teaching Latin were dangerously out of date and ineffective.

The decline in use of Latin was different and depended on local cultural factors. 

In secular academic use, however, New Latin declined sharply and then continuously after about 1700. Although Latin texts continued to be written throughout the 18th and into the 19th century, their number and their scope diminished over time. In some cases, for instance in Hungary and Croatia, Latin was still in significant cultural use, including spoken ability, through the nineteenth century. 

By 1900, very few new texts were being created in Latin for practical purposes, and the production of Latin texts had become little more than a hobby for Latin enthusiasts in the English speaking world. 

Nevertheless, composition of serious Latin poetry continued, such as those by Antonius Smerdel and Jan Novák. In Smerdel's case, his free verse written in Latin has modernist as well as classical and Christian elements. His choice of Latin as a medium reflects both the relative local relevance of Latin, and a means to evade the attention of political censors.

Some Latin texts were written for specific cases, for instance classical music pieces, like as Stravinsky's Oedipus Rex.

Around the beginning of the 19th century came a renewed emphasis on the study of Classical Latin as the spoken language of the Romans of the 1st centuries BC and AD. This new emphasis, similar to that of the Humanists but based on broader linguistic, historical, and critical studies of Latin literature, led to the exclusion of Neo-Latin literature from academic studies in schools and universities (except for advanced historical language studies); to the abandonment of New Latin neologisms; and to an increasing interest in the reconstructed Classical pronunciation, which displaced the several regional pronunciations in Europe in the early 20th century.

Coincident with these changes in Latin instruction, and to some degree motivating them, came a concern about lack of Latin proficiency among students. Latin had already lost its privileged role as the core subject of elementary instruction; and as education spread to the middle and lower classes, it tended to be dropped altogether. By the mid-20th century, even the trivial acquaintance with Latin typical of the 19th-century student was a thing of the past.

Relics

Ecclesiastical Latin, the form of New Latin used in the Roman Catholic Church, remained in use throughout the period and after. Until the Second Vatican Council of 1962–65 all priests were expected to have competency in it, and it was studied in Catholic schools. It is today still the official language of the Church, and all Catholic priests of the Latin liturgical rites are required by canon law to have competency in the language.

New Latin is also the source of the biological system of binomial nomenclature and classification of living organisms devised by Carl Linnaeus, although the rules of the ICZN allow the construction of names that deviate considerably from historical norms. (See also classical compounds.) Another continuation is the use of Latin names for the surface features of planets and planetary satellites (planetary nomenclature), originated in the mid-17th century for selenographic toponyms. New Latin has also contributed a vocabulary for specialized fields such as anatomy and law; some of these words have become part of the normal, non-technical vocabulary of various European languages.

Pronunciation

New Latin had no single pronunciation, but a host of local variants or dialects, all distinct both from each other and from the historical pronunciation of Latin at the time of the Roman Republic and Roman Empire. As a rule, the local pronunciation of Latin used sounds identical to those of the dominant local language; the result of a concurrently evolving pronunciation in the living languages and the corresponding spoken dialects of Latin. Despite this variation, there are some common characteristics to nearly all of the dialects of New Latin, for instance:
 The use of a sibilant fricative or affricate in place of a stop for the letters c and sometimes g, when preceding a front vowel.
 The use of a sibilant fricative or affricate for the letter t when not at the beginning of the first syllable and preceding an unstressed i followed by a vowel.
 The use of a labiodental fricative for most instances of the letter v (or consonantal u), instead of the classical labiovelar approximant .
 The merger of æ and œ with e, and of y with i.
 The loss of the distinction between short and long vowels, with such vowel distinctions as remain being dependent upon word-stress.

The regional dialects of New Latin can be grouped into families, according to the extent to which they share common traits of pronunciation. The major division is between Western and Eastern family of New Latin. The Western family includes most Romance-speaking regions (France, Spain, Portugal, Italy) and the British Isles; the Eastern family includes Central Europe (Germany and Poland), Eastern Europe (Russia and Ukraine) and Scandinavia (Denmark, Sweden).

The Western family is characterized, inter alia, by having a front variant of the letter g before the vowels æ, e, i, œ, y and also pronouncing j in the same way (except in Italy). In the Eastern Latin family, j is always pronounced , and g had the same sound (usually ) in front of both front and back vowels; exceptions developed later in some Scandinavian countries.

The following table illustrates some of the variation of New Latin consonants found in various countries of Europe, compared to the Classical Latin pronunciation of the 1st centuries BC to AD.

Orthography

New Latin texts are primarily found in early printed editions, which present certain features of spelling and the use of diacritics distinct from the Latin of antiquity, medieval Latin manuscript conventions, and representations of Latin in modern printed editions.

Characters
In spelling, New Latin, in all but the earliest texts, distinguishes the letter u from v and i from j. In older texts printed down to c. 1630, v was used in initial position (even when it represented a vowel, e.g. in vt, later printed ut) and u was used elsewhere, e.g. in nouus, later printed novus. Where the pronunciation remained , as after g, q and s, the spelling u continued to be used for the consonant, e.g. in lingua, qualis, and suadeo.

The letter j generally represented a consonantal sound (pronounced in various ways in different European countries, e.g. It appeared, for instance, in jam "already" or jubet "he/she orders" (earlier spelled iam and iubet).
It was also found between vowels in the words ejus, hujus, cujus (earlier spelled eius, huius, cuius), and pronounced as a consonant; likewise in such forms as major and pejor. J was also used when the last in a sequence of two or more i'''s, e.g. radij (now spelled radii) "rays", alijs "to others", iij, the Roman numeral 3; however, ij was for the most part replaced by ii by 1700.

In common with texts in other languages using the Roman alphabet, Latin texts down to c. 1800 used the letter-form ſ (the long s) for s in positions other than at the end of a word; e.g. ipſiſſimus.

The digraphs ae and oe were typically written using the ligatures æ and œ (e.g. Cæsar, pœna) except when part of a word in all capitals, such as in titles, chapter headings, or captions. More rarely (and usually in 16th- to early 17th-century texts) the e caudata was used as a substitute for the digraphs.

Diacritics

Three kinds of diacritic were in common use: the acute accent ´, the grave accent `, and the circumflex accent ˆ. These were normally only marked on vowels (e.g. í, è, â); but see below regarding que.

The acute accent marked a stressed syllable, but was usually confined to those where the stress was not in its normal position, as determined by vowel length and syllabic weight. In practice, it was typically found on the vowel in the syllable immediately preceding a final clitic, particularly que "and", ve "or" and ne, a question marker; e.g. idémque "and the same (thing)". Some printers, however, put this acute accent over the q in the enclitic que, e.g. eorumq́ue "and their". The acute accent fell out of favor by the 19th century.

The grave accent had various uses, none related to pronunciation or stress. It was always found on the preposition à (variant of ab "by" or "from") and likewise on the preposition è (variant of ex "from" or "out of"). It might also be found on the interjection ò "O". Most frequently, it was found on the last (or only) syllable of various adverbs and conjunctions, particularly those that might be confused with prepositions or with inflected forms of nouns, verbs, or adjectives. Examples include certè "certainly", verò "but", primùm "at first", pòst "afterwards", cùm "when", adeò "so far, so much", unà "together", quàm "than". In some texts the grave was found over the clitics such as que, in which case the acute accent did not appear before them.

The circumflex accent represented metrical length (generally not distinctively pronounced in the New Latin period) and was chiefly found over an a representing an ablative singular case, e.g. eâdem formâ "with the same shape". It might also be used to distinguish two words otherwise spelled identically, but distinct in vowel length; e.g. hîc "here" differentiated from hic "this", fugêre "they have fled" (=fūgērunt) distinguished from fugere "to flee", or senatûs "of the senate" distinct from senatus "the senate". It might also be used for vowels arising from contraction, e.g. nôsti for novisti "you know", imperâsse for imperavisse "to have commanded", or dî for dei or dii.

Notable works (1500–1900)

Literature and biography
 1511. Stultitiæ Laus, essay by Erasmus.
 1516. Utopia  by Thomas More
 1525 and 1538. Hispaniola and Emerita, two comedies by Juan Maldonado.
 1546. Sintra, a poem by Luisa Sigea de Velasco.
 1602. Cenodoxus, a play by Jacob Bidermann.
 1608. Parthenica, two books of poetry by Elizabeth Jane Weston.
 1621. Argenis, a novel by John Barclay.
 1626–1652. Poems by John Milton.
 1634. Somnium, a scientific fantasy by Johannes Kepler.
 1741. Nicolai Klimii Iter Subterraneum , a satire by Ludvig Holberg.
 1761. Slawkenbergii Fabella, short parodic piece in Laurence Sterne's Tristram Shandy.
 1767. Apollo et Hyacinthus, intermezzo by Rufinus Widl (with music by Wolfgang Amadeus Mozart).
 1835. Georgii Washingtonii, Americæ Septentrionalis Civitatum Fœderatarum Præsidis Primi, Vita, biography of George Washington by Francis Glass.

Scientific works
 1543. De Revolutionibus Orbium Cœlestium by Nicolaus Copernicus
 1545. Ars Magna by Hieronymus Cardanus
 1551–58 and 1587. Historia animalium by Conrad Gessner.
 1600. De Magnete, Magneticisque Corporibus et de Magno Magnete Tellure by William Gilbert.
 1609. Astronomia nova by Johannes Kepler.
 1610. Sidereus Nuncius by Galileo Galilei.
 1620. Novum Organum by Francis Bacon.
 1628. Exercitatio Anatomica de Motu Cordis et Sanguinis in Animalibus by William Harvey. 
 1659. Systema Saturnium by Christiaan Huygens.
 1673. Horologium Oscillatorium by Christiaan Huygens. Also at Gallica.
 1687. Philosophiæ Naturalis Principia Mathematica by Isaac Newton. 
 1703. Hortus Malabaricus by Hendrik van Rheede. 
 1735. Systema Naturae by Carl Linnaeus.  
 1737. Mechanica sive motus scientia analytice exposita by Leonhard Euler.
 1738. Hydrodynamica, sive de viribus et motibus fluidorum commentarii by Daniel Bernoulli.
1747.  Antilucretius by Cardinal de Polignac
 1748. Introductio in analysin infinitorum by Leonhard Euler.
 1753. Species Plantarum by Carl Linnaeus.
 1758. Systema Naturae (10th ed.) by Carolus Linnaeus.
 1791. De viribus electricitatis in motu musculari by Aloysius Galvani.
 1801. Disquisitiones Arithmeticae by Carl Gauss.
 1810. Prodromus Florae Novae Hollandiae et Insulae Van Diemen by Robert Brown.
 1830. Fundamenta nova theoriae functionum ellipticarum by Carl Gustav Jacob Jacobi.
 1840. Flora Brasiliensis by Carl Friedrich Philipp von Martius.
 1864.  Philosophia zoologica by Jan van der Hoeven.
 1889. Arithmetices principia, nova methodo exposita by Giuseppe Peano

Other technical subjects
 1511–1516. De Orbe Novo Decades by Peter Martyr d'Anghiera.
 1514. De Asse et Partibus by Guillaume Budé.
 1524. De motu Hispaniæ by Juan Maldonado.
 1525. De subventione pauperum sive de humanis necessitatibus libri duo by Juan Luis Vives.
 1530. Syphilis, sive, De Morbo Gallico by Girolamo Fracastoro(transcription)
 1531. De disciplinis libri XX by Juan Luis Vives.
 1552. Colloquium de aulica et privata vivendi ratione by Luisa Sigea de Velasco.
 1553. Christianismi Restitutio by Michael Servetus. A mainly theological treatise, where the function of pulmonary circulation was first described by a European, more than half a century before Harvey. For the non-trinitarian message of this book Servetus was denounced by Calvin and his followers, condemned by the French Inquisition, and burnt alive just outside Geneva. Only three copies survived.
 1554. De naturæ philosophia seu de Platonis et Aristotelis consensione libri quinque by Sebastián Fox Morcillo.
 1582. Rerum Scoticarum Historia by George Buchanan (transcription)
 1587. Minerva sive de causis linguæ Latinæ by Francisco Sánchez de las Brozas.
 1589. De natura Novi Orbis libri duo et de promulgatione euangelii apud barbaros sive de procuranda Indorum salute by José de Acosta.
 1597. Disputationes metaphysicæ by Francisco Suárez.
 1599. De rege et regis institutione by Juan de Mariana.
 1604–1608. Historia sui temporis by Jacobus Augustus Thuanus.  
 1612. De legibus by Francisco Suárez.
 1615. De Christiana expeditione apud Sinas by Matteo Ricci and Nicolas Trigault.
 1625. De jure belli ac pacis by Hugo Grotius. (Posner Collection facsimile; Gallica facsimile)
 1641. Meditationes de prima philosophia by René Descartes. (The Latin, French and English by John Veitch.)
 1642–1658. Elementa Philosophica by Thomas Hobbes.
 1652–1654. Œdipus Ægyptiacus by Athanasius Kircher.
 1655. Novus Atlas Sinensis by Martino Martini.
 1656. Flora Sinensis by Michael Boym.
 1657. Orbis Sensualium Pictus by John Amos Comenius. (Hoole parallel Latin/English translation, 1777; Online version in Latin)
 1670. Tractatus Theologico-Politicus by Baruch Spinoza.
 1677. Ethica, ordine geometrico demonstrata by Baruch Spinoza.
 1725. Gradus ad Parnassum by Johann Joseph Fux. An influential treatise on musical counterpoint.
 1780. De rebus gestis Caroli V Imperatoris et Regis Hispaniæ and De rebus Hispanorum gestis ad Novum Orbem Mexicumque by Juan Ginés de Sepúlveda.
 1891. De primis socialismi germanici lineamentis apud Lutherum, Kant, Fichte et Hegel by Jean Jaurès

See also

 Binomial nomenclature
 Botanical Latin
 Classical compound
 Ludwig Boltzmann Institute for Neo-Latin Studies
 Romance languages, sometimes called Neo-Latin languages

Notes

Further reading

 Black, Robert. 2007. Humanism and Education in Medieval and Renaissance Italy. Cambridge, UK: Cambridge Univ. Press.
 Bloemendal, Jan, and Howard B. Norland, eds. 2013. Neo-Latin Drama and Theatre in Early Modern Europe. Leiden, The Netherlands: Brill.
 Burnett, Charles, and Nicholas Mann, eds. 2005. Britannia Latina: Latin in the Culture of Great Britain from the Middle Ages to the Twentieth Century. Warburg Institute Colloquia 8. London: Warburg Institute.
 Butterfield, David. 2011. "Neo-Latin". In A Blackwell Companion to the Latin Language. Edited by James Clackson, 303–18. Chichester, UK: Wiley-Blackwell.
 Churchill, Laurie J., Phyllis R. Brown, and Jane E. Jeffrey, eds. 2002. Women Writing in Latin: From Roman Antiquity to Early Modern Europe. Vol. 3, Early Modern Women Writing Latin. New York: Routledge.
 Coroleu, Alejandro. 2010. "Printing and Reading Italian Neo-Latin Bucolic Poetry in Early Modern Europe". Grazer Beitrage 27: 53–69.
 de Beer, Susanna, K. A. E. Enenkel, and David Rijser. 2009. The Neo-Latin Epigram: A Learned and Witty Genre. Supplementa Lovaniensia 25. Leuven, Belgium: Leuven Univ. Press.
 De Smet, Ingrid A. R. 1999. "Not for Classicists? The State of Neo-Latin Studies". Journal of Roman Studies 89: 205–9.
 Ford, Philip. 2000. "Twenty-Five Years of Neo-Latin Studies". Neulateinisches Jahrbuch 2: 293–301.
 Ford, Philip, Jan Bloemendal, and Charles Fantazzi, eds. 2014. Brill’s Encyclopaedia of the Neo-Latin World. Two vols. Leiden, The Netherlands: Brill.
 Godman, Peter, and Oswyn Murray, eds. 1990. Latin Poetry and the Classical Tradition: Essays in Medieval and Renaissance Literature. Oxford: Clarendon.
 Haskell, Yasmin, and Juanita Feros Ruys, eds. 2010. Latin and Alterity in the Early Modern Period. Arizona Studies in the Middle Ages and Renaissance 30. Tempe: Arizona Univ. Press
 Helander, Hans. 2001. "Neo-Latin Studies: Significance and Prospects". Symbolae Osloenses 76.1: 5–102.
 IJsewijn, Jozef with Dirk Sacré. Companion to Neo-Latin Studies. Two vols. Leuven University Press, 1990–1998.
 Knight, Sarah, and Stefan Tilg, eds. 2015. The Oxford Handbook of Neo-Latin. New York: Oxford University Press.
 
 Miller, John F. 2003. "Ovid's Fasti and the Neo-Latin Christian Calendar Poem". International Journal of Classical Tradition 10.2:173–186.
 Moul, Victoria. 2017. A Guide to Neo-Latin Literature. New York: Cambridge University Press.
 
 Tournoy, Gilbert, and Terence O. Tunberg. 1996. "On the Margins of Latinity? Neo-Latin and the Vernacular Languages". Humanistica Lovaniensia 45:134–175.
 van Hal, Toon. 2007. "Towards Meta-neo-Latin Studies? Impetus to Debate on the Field of Neo-Latin Studies and its Methodology". Humanistica Lovaniensia 56:349–365.

External links

 An Analytic Bibliography of On-line Neo-Latin Titles — Bibliography of Renaissance Latin and Neo-Latin literature on the web.
 A Lost Continent of Literature: The rise and fall of Neo-Latin, the universal language of the Renaissance. — An essay on Neo-Latin literature by James Hankins from the I Tatti Renaissance Library website.
 CAMENA  – Latin Texts of Early Modern Europe
 Database of Nordic Neo-Latin Literature 
 Heinsius collection: Dutch Neo-Latin poetry
 Latinitas Nova at Bibliotheca Augustana
 
 
 
 
 
 

Latin language
6 New
Latin-language literature
History of literature
Languages attested from the 16th century
16th-century establishments in Europe